The Republican Centre (CR) was a French parliamentary group in the Chamber of Deputies of France during the French Third Republic founded in 1932 by André Tardieu following his failure at transforming the Democratic Alliance into a large liberal-conservative party.

See also 
Liberalism and radicalism in France
Democratic Republican Alliance
Independent Radicals
Sinistrisme

Defunct political parties in France
Political parties of the French Third Republic
Parliamentary groups in France
Political parties established in 1932
1932 establishments in France
Political parties with year of disestablishment missing
Opportunist Republicans